A grappling hold, commonly referred to simply as a hold that in Japanese is referred to as katame-waza ( "grappling technique"), is any specific grappling, wrestling, judo, or other martial art grip that is applied to an opponent. Grappling holds are used principally to control the opponent and to advance in points or positioning. The holds may be categorized by their function, such as clinching, pinning, or submission, while others can be classified by their anatomical effect: chokehold, headlock, joint-lock, or compression lock. Multiple categories may be appropriate for some of these holds.

Clinch hold

A clinch hold (also known as a clinching hold) is a grappling hold that is used in clinch fighting with the purpose of controlling the opponent. In wrestling it is referred to as the tie-up.  The use of a clinch hold results in the clinch. Clinch holds can be used to close in on the opponent, as a precursor to a takedown or throw, or to prevent the opponent from moving away or striking effectively. Typical clinch holds include:

 Bear hug
 Collar tie
 Overhook
 Pinch grip tie
 Underhook

Pinning hold

A pinning hold (also known as a hold down and in Japanese as osaekomi-waza, 抑え込み技, "pinning technique") is a general grappling hold used in ground fighting that is aimed to subdue by exerting superior control over an opponent and pinning the opponent to the ground. Pinning holds where both of the opponent's shoulders touch the ground are considered winning conditions in several combat sports.

An effective pinning hold is a winning condition in many styles of wrestling, and is known as simply a "pin". Pinning holds maintained for 20 seconds are also a winning condition in Judo. Pinning holds are also used in submission wrestling and mixed martial arts, even though the pinning hold itself is not a winning condition. The holds can be used to rest while the opponent tries to escape, to control the opponent while striking, a tactic known as ground and pound, or to control an opponent from striking by pinning them to the ground, also known as lay and pray.

Submission hold

In combat sports a submission hold (colloquially referred to as a "submission") is a grappling hold that is applied with the purpose of forcing an opponent to submit out of either extreme pain or fear of injury. Submission holds are used primarily in ground fighting and can be separated into constrictions (chokeholds, compression locks, suffocation locks) and manipulations (joint locks, leverages, pain compliance holds). When used, these techniques may cause dislocation, torn ligaments, bone fractures, unconsciousness, or even death.

Common combat sports featuring submission holds are:

 Jujutsu
 Judo
 Sambo
 Catch wrestling
 Shoot wrestling
 Brazilian Jiu-Jitsu
 Mixed martial arts

List of grappling holds
The same hold may be called by different names in different arts or countries. Some of the more common names for grappling holds in contemporary English include:

Joint locks

Joint lock: Any stabilization of one or more joints at their normal extreme range of motion
 Boston Crab: A type of spinal lock originating from catch wrestling and mostly employed in professional wrestling performances, but has been used to win a fight in MMA.
 Can opener: A type of neck crank
 Crucifix: A type of neck crank
 Neck crank: Applies pressure to the neck by pulling or twisting the head
 Nelson: (quarter, half, three-quarter and full): The arm is circled under the opponent's arm, and secured at the neck
 Small joint manipulation: Joint locks on the fingers or toes
 Spine crank: Applies pressure to the spine by twisting or bending the body
 Twister: A type of body bend and neck crank
 Wristlock: A general term for joint locks on the wrist or radioulnar joint; wristlocks form the trademark offense of Aikido, and are used in combination with keylocks in catch wrestling

Armlocks

Armlock: A general term for joint locks at the elbow or shoulder
 Americana: BJJ term for a lateral keylock
 Armbar: An armlock that hyperextends the elbow
 Chicken wing: Term for various hammer/keylocks, especially among Shoot wrestling and Jeet Kune Do practitioners
 Flying armbar: A type of armbar that is performed from a stand-up position
 Hammerlock: Pins the opponent's arm behind the back, with wrist toward their own shoulder
 Juji-Gatame: A type of armbar where the arm is held in-between the legs
 Keylock: A shoulderlock where the arm is turned like a key
 Kimura: BJJ term for a medial keylock
 Omoplata: BJJ term for a shoulder lock using the legs

Leglock

Leglock: A general term for joint locks at the hip, knee, or ankle
 Ankle lock: A leglock that hyper extends the ankle
 Heel hook: A leglock that attacks the knee
 Kneebar: A leglock that hyperextends the knee
 Toe hold: A type of leglock that hyper extends the ankle

Chokeholds and strangles

 Anaconda choke: A type of arm triangle choke
 Arm triangle choke: A chokehold similar to the triangle choke except using the arms
 Crosschoke: Athlete crosses own arms in "X" shape and holds onto opponent's gi or clothing
 Ezequiel: Reverse of the rear naked choke, using the inside of the sleeves for grip
 Gearlock: A modified sleeper hold that puts an incredible amount of force on the opponent's windpipe, choking them out almost instantly if applied properly 
 Gi Choke: or Okuri eri jime as it is known in Judo is a single lapel strangle
 Gogoplata (Hell's Gate): Performed by putting one's shin on the wind pipe of an opponent and pulling the head down; typically set up from the rubber guard
 Guillotine choke: A facing choke, usually applied to an opponent from above
 Locoplata: A variation of the Gogo-plata that uses the other foot to push the shin into the windpipe and uses the arm to wrap around the back of the head to grab the foot to secure the choke
 North–south choke: A chokehold applied from the north-south position with opponent facing up; uses the shoulder and biceps to cut off air flow
 Rear naked choke: A chokehold from the rear
 Triangle choke: A chokehold that forms a triangle around the opponent's head using the legs

Clinch holds

 Bear hug: A clinching hold encircling the opponent's torso with both arms, pulling toward oneself
 Collar tie: Facing the opponent with one or both hands on the back of their head/neck
 Muay Thai clinch: Holding the opponent with both arms around the neck while standing
 Overhook: Holding over the opponent's arm while standing
 Pinch grip tie: Term for a particular harness hold, common in Greco-Roman wrestling circles
 Underhook: Holding under the opponent's arm while standing
 Tie: A transitional hold used to stabilize the opponent in preparation for striking or throwing

Compression locks

 Achilles lock: A compression lock on the achilles tendon
 Biceps slicer: A compression lock on the elbow joint and biceps
 Figure four: (also referred to as arm triangle, leg triangle) Term for arranging one's own arm or legs to resemble shape of numeral "4" when holding opponent
 Leg slicer: A compression lock on the calf and thigh

Pain compliance

 Chin lock: An arm hold on the chin that hurts the chin.

Pinning hold

 Cradle: Compress opponent in a sit-up position to pin shoulders from side mount
 Staple: Using the opponent's clothing to help pin them against a surface

Other grappling holds
 Grapevine: Twisting limbs around limbs in a manner similar to a plant vine
 Harness: A hold that encircles the torso of an opponent, sometimes diagonally
 Headlock: Circling the opponent's head with an arm, especially from the side; also called a rear Chancery
 Hooks: Wrapping the arm or leg around an opponent's limb(s) for greater control
 Leg scissors: Causes compressive asphyxia by pressing the chest or abdomen
 Scissor: Places the opponent between the athlete's legs (like paper to be cut by scissors)
 Stack: Compresses the opponent in a vertical sit-up position (feet up) to pin their shoulders to mat

See also
 Chokehold
 Clinch fighting
 Compression lock
 Grappling
 Ground fighting
 Joint lock
 Judo techniques
 Jujutsu techniques
 Professional wrestling holds

References

 Brazilian Jiu-Jitsu: Theory and Technique by Renzo Gracie and Royler Gracie (2001). 
 Championship Wrestling, Revised Edition. (Annapolis MD: United States Naval Institute, 1950).
 No Holds Barred Fighting: The Ultimate Guide to Submission Wrestling by Mark Hatmaker with Doug Werner. 
 Small-Circle Jujitsu by Wally Jay. (Burbank CA: Ohara Publications, 1989).

External links
Free Jiu-Jitsu and Submission Grappling Videos 
The Subtle Science of the Muay Thai Clinch By Roberto Pedreira Includes pictures of common Muay Thai clinching holds.
 Lessons in Wrestling and Physical Culture, a scan of the 1912 correspondence course from Martin 'Farmer' Burns.
List of Submissions for MMA Grappling holds and submissions used in MMA. Each submission links to videos and step by step instruction.
 categorized judo techniques on video - Tournaments, champions, Olympics etc.
Mixed Martial Arts Search Engine A search engine covering all things exclusive to MMA.
MMA Training Free MMA Training help and advice.
MMM Submission Moves  10 Submission Moves For MMA Athlets.
Female Wrestling Channel Rules Competitive Female Wrestling Pin and Submission Rules at the Female Wrestling Channel
 Free book focusing on the mount position

 
Wrestling